Chris Lorenzo may refer to:

 a character played by the actor Rob Estes from 1991-95 on the USA Network show Silk Stalkings
 the brother of Irv Gotti and part-owner of The Inc. Records